Kevin James O'Connor (born 20 June 1940) is a former New Zealand cricketer who played six first-class matches for the Otago Volts in the early 1970s. He was born in Dunedin.

See also
 List of Otago representative cricketers

References

1940 births
Living people
New Zealand cricketers
Otago cricketers